The Latorița is a right tributary of the river Lotru in Romania. It feeds the reservoirs Galbenu and Petrimanu. It discharges into the Lotru near Valea Măceșului.

Tributaries

The following rivers are tributaries to the river Latorița (from source to mouth):

Left: Coasta Benghii, Zănoguța, Pârâul Șoimului, Petrimanu, Turcinul Mic, Turcinul Mare, Înșirata, Pârâul de sub Stâna Măricenilor, Lazul, Pârâul Feții, Pârâul Fagului, Rudăreasa, Mogani, Cireșu
Right: Latorița de Mijloc (Muntenu), Latorița de Jos (Urdele), Galbenu, Izvorul Stânei, Igoiu, Pristos, Hoampa, Curmătura, Izvorul cu Hotar, Holuzu, Pârâul Crucii, Pârâul Răgăliei, Borogeana Mare, Pârâul lui Duminecă, Pârâul Adânc, Vătăielu, Repedea

References

Rivers of Romania
Rivers of Vâlcea County